The 2014 Toulon Tournament was the 42nd edition of the Toulon Tournament. The competition took place between 21 May and 1 June 2014 mostly in the Provence-Alpes-Côte d'Azur region of South Eastern France. Brazil successfully defended their title, beating France 5–2 in the final.

Participants

 (hosts)

Squads

Venues

Results

In February 2014, the Football Association announced that the group draw had been made. The group stage takes place between May 21, 2014 and May 29, 2014.  Matches were played in 40-minute halves, rather than the usual 45.

Group A

Group B

Third place play-off

Final

Goalscorers
4 goals
 Jean-Christophe Bahebeck

3 goals

 Ademilson
 Luan
 Hélder Costa
 Ricardo Horta

2 goals

 Alisson
 Rodrigo Caio
 Thalles
 Christian Bravo
 Sebastián Martínez
 Joao Rodríguez
 Hadi Sacko
 Cauley Woodrow

1 goal

 Leandro
 Lucas Piazon
 Lucas Silva
 Marquinhos
 Mosquito
 Wallace
 Nicolás Castillo
 Juan Delgado
 Guo Yi
 Li Yuanyi
 Wang Xinhui
 Xie Pengfei
 Yang Chaosheng
 Rafael Borré
 Jordan Cousins
 Jake Forster-Caskey
 Jordan Obita
 James Ward-Prowse
 Sébastien Haller
 Adrien Hunou
 Jordan Ikoko
 Mouhamadou-Naby Sarr
 Daniel Hernández
 Hedgardo Marín
 Carlos Treviño
 Bruno Fernandes
 Rúben Semedo
 Leandro Silva
 Rúben Vezo
 João Teixeira
 Ahmed Al Saadi
 Ahmed Doozandeh
 Lee Chang-min
 Moon Chang-jin
 Shin Il-soo

References

External links 
Toulon Tournament

 
2014
2013–14 in French football
2014 in youth association football
May 2014 sports events in France
June 2014 sports events in France